Italy alternates between Central European Time (UTC+01:00) and Central European Summer Time (UTC+02:00), because it follows the European Summer Time annual Daylight saving time procedure. As such Italy begins observing Central European Summer Time at 02:00 CET on the last Sunday in March and switches back to Central European Time on the last Sunday of October since 1996.